Expo 2015 was a World Expo hosted by Milan, Italy. It opened on May 1 at 10:00 CEST and closed on October 31. Milan hosted an exposition for the second time; the first was the 1906 Milan International.

The Bureau International des Expositions (BIE) general assembly in Paris decided in favour of Milan on March 31, 2008. On November 23, 2010, the event was announced by the BIE. Expo 2015's theme was "Feeding the Planet, Energy for Life".

Themes
Expo 2015's theme was "Feeding the Planet, Energy for Life", encompassing technology, innovation, culture, traditions and creativity and how they relate to food and diet. The exposition developed themes introduced in earlier expos (such as water at Expo 2008 in Zaragoza) in light of new global scenarios and emerging issues, focusing on the right to healthy, secure and sufficient food for the world's inhabitants. Futuristic concerns about food security are compounded by forecasts of increasing uncertainty about the quantity of food which will be available globally. The exposition had seven sub-themes:
 Science for food safety, security and quality
 Innovation in the agro-food supply chain
 Technology for agriculture and biodiversity
 Dietary education
 Solidarity and cooperation on food
 Food for better lifestyles
 Food in the world's cultures and ethnic groups

Site

It is adjacent to the Fiera Milano fairgrounds, designed by Massimiliano Fuksas, which may be considered the cornerstone of the area's urban redevelopment. It had long been an industrial zone before its conversion to logistical and municipal services and agriculture. The fairgrounds and the Expo site were connected by a pedestrian bridge adjacent to the Rho-Pero high-speed rail station. Originally-planned bicycle paths were never constructed, and several motorways were built (or expanded) to allow access to the site.

The design of pools and waterways in and around the Expo area was an element of primary importance.

Initial plan

The initial plan had the following elements:
50 percent of the area occupied by pavilions, 35 percent dedicated to space around each pavilion and the remaining 15 percent a green perimeter around the site
Piazza Italia and Piazza Expo at either end of the main boulevard, the former dominated by the  Italy pavilion and flanked by a second square (Piazza delle Regioni)
A large, artificial lake surrounded by the 20 pavilions representing the Italian regions
A 12,000-seat amphitheatre covering  and a 6,000-seat,  auditorium
Country pavilions in three sizes, depending on the financial resources of the participating country
Three pavilions dedicated to geographic areas: Asia, Africa and Latin America and the Caribbean

A  service area was planned near the main Expo site with hotels, parking facilities, stores, a convention centre, green areas, a business centre available to Expo participants and a  Expo Village to house staff, volunteers and security and administrative personnel.

The following thematic pavilions were also planned:
What the World Eats: At the base of the Expo tower and in the pedestrian bridge connecting the Rho-Pero fairgrounds to the expo site
Science and Conscience
Tales of Land, Air and Water
The Food Spiral
The Right to Eat Well
In the Realm of the Senses, in Piazza Italia
Equilibrium
The Art of Food

Concept

Expo 2015's concept was presented on September 8, 2009. It was designed by a committee of four architects: Stefano Boeri, Richard Burdett, Mark Rylander and Jacques Herzog.

The main idea was to trace two avenues (a main and a secondary avenue), representing the ancient Roman layout of a cardo and a decumanus. The initial idea of a "classical" site composed of avenues and pavilions was replaced by the idea of a "light" Expo composed of exhibition areas arranged across the main boulevard. The exhibition areas, identical for each country, recreated the typical food cycle of each nation from production to consumption. The centre of the avenue was occupied by a table in front of the country pavilions extending the length of the site, where visitors could sample foods produced in each country's pavilion. The area would be covered by large, tent-like structures to convey the idea of a global marketplace.

A second idea was to build large greenhouses on the site to reproduce the earth's principal biomes. These would be thematic pavilions for the cultivation and production of basic foodstuffs used in the individual country pavilions. Each country would have a dedicated greenhouse in its exhibition area. In this version of the site, water remained an important element but was shifted toward the exterior as a large, navigable canal surrounding the site. A large lake was also included in the design. Additional elements included a large, excavated amphitheatre and a hill, one at each end of the boulevard; expo village facilities across the encircling canal from the site, and redevelopment of the post-office building as a centre for sustainable development.

Master plan

The master plan for Expo 2015, coordinated by Stefano Boeri, was delivered to the BIE during its April 30, 2010 registration ceremony in Paris. Changes included:
Buildable areas were reduced to 30 percent of the area assigned to each exhibitor.
The large, but not navigable, canal around the area is maintained;
The tent roofing remained only along the axes of the cardo and the decumanus.
Greenhouses would be in a  zone.
The circular canal became a theatre on the water, with a central stage.
The green hill opposite the amphitheatre would be built of earth from the amphitheatre excavation.
An auditorium was included.

Participants
Expo participants included 145 countries, three international organizations and several civil society organizations, corporations and non-governmental organizations (NGOs). Participants were hosted in individual or grouped pavilions.

Countries

Each participating country was hosted in a self-constructed pavilion and included on the Expo website. Some countries, such as Belarus, Belgium, Israel and
Germany, created external websites. As part of a reciprocity protocol with Expo 2010 in Shanghai, on December 8, 2008, China was the first country to formalise its participation in Expo 2015. The first country outside the reciprocity protocol to confirm its participation was Switzerland, on February 3, 2011. As in other years, during the Expo visitors could purchase a passport which could be stamped.

Two major countries which did not participate were Australia and Canada, who withdrew despite participating in the previous Expo in Shanghai, citing budgetary restrictions.

The following countries participated:

 Islamic Republic of Afghanistan
 Albania
 Algeria
 Angola
 Argentina
 Armenia
 Austria
 Azerbaijan
 Bahrain
 Bangladesh
 Belarus
 Belgium
 Benin
 Bolivia
 Bosnia and Herzegovina
 Brazil
 Brunei
 Burundi
 Cambodia
 Cameroon
 Cape Verde
 Central African Republic
 Chile
 China
 Colombia
 Comoros
 Republic of the Congo
 Croatia
 Cuba
 Czech Republic
 Democratic Republic of the Congo
 Djibouti
 Dominica
 Dominican Republic
 Ecuador
 Egypt
 El Salvador
 Equatorial Guinea
 Eritrea
 Estonia
 Ethiopia
 France
 Gabon
 Gambia
 Georgia
 Germany
 Ghana
 Greece
 Grenada
 Guatemala
 Guinea
 Guinea-Bissau
 Haiti
 Holy See
 Honduras
 Hungary
 India
 Indonesia
 Iran
 Ireland
 Israel
 Italy
 Ivory Coast
 Japan
 Kazakhstan
 Kenya
 Kuwait
 Kyrgyzstan
 Laos
 Lebanon
 Lithuania
 Madagascar
 Malaysia
 Maldives
 Malta
 Mauritania
 Mexico
 Moldova
 Monaco
 Montenegro
 Morocco
 Mozambique
 Nepal
 Netherlands
 North Korea
 Oman
 Poland
 Qatar
 Romania
 Russia
 Rwanda
 San Marino
 São Tomé and Príncipe
 Senegal
 Serbia
 Sierra Leone
 Slovakia
 Slovenia
 Somalia
 South Korea (as Republic of Korea)
 Spain
 Sri Lanka
 Switzerland
 Tanzania
 Thailand
 Timor-Leste
 Togo
 Tunisia
 Turkey
 Turkmenistan
 Uganda
 United Arab Emirates
 United Kingdom
 United States
 Uruguay
 Uzbekistan
 Vanuatu
 Venezuela
 Vietnam
 Yemen
 Zambia
 Zimbabwe

Nongovernmental organizations
 ActionAid
 Cesvi
 Amity University
 Andrea Bocelli Foundation
 Caritas Internationalis
 Cibus-Federalimentare
 Don Bosco Network
 Fairtrade International
 Fondazione Triulza
 KIP International School
 Lions Clubs International
 National Observatory for Women's Health
 Oxfam International
 Save the Children
 Venerable Factory of the Duomo of Milan
 WAA-AMIA/CONAF
 World Wide Fund for Nature

International organizations
 CERN
 European Union
 United Nations

Companies
 China Corporate United Pavilion
 Coca-Cola
 Joomoo
 New Holland Agriculture
 Vanke

Agreements

In preparation for Expo 2015, the City of Milan signed coordination agreements with other cities in Italy and Europe focusing on tourism, culture and infrastructure. Agreements were also signed with other countries for the development of projects associated with food and education.

Partners

Official partners
 Alitalia, Etihad Airways: airlines
 BolognaFiere: operations
 Came: automation, management and access control of visitors
 Cisco: IP network and solutions
 Coca-Cola: soft drinks
 Eni: sustainability initiatives in African countries
 Eutelsat: satellite
 Excelsior Milano: T-shirts and gadgets
 Ferrero SpA: confectionery specialties
 Franciacorta DOCG: sparking wine
 Fiera Milano: operations
 Illy: Italian coffee
 Huiyuan Juice: fruit juice
 McDonald's: fast food
 MSC: cruises
 OVS Industry: T-shirts and gadgets
 Technogym: wellness and sport
 Trenitalia: rail carrier
 Sicily: Regione Siciliana managing the Bio-Mediterraneum Cluster

Media partners
 Canon: photography
 Rai: television

Global partners
 Accenture: system integration
 Allianz: visitor assistance
 CNH Industrial: agriculture
 Enel: smart energy and lighting
 Fiat-Chrysler: sustainable mobility
 Finmeccanica (Selex ES): Safe City and Main Operation Centre
 Intesa Sanpaolo: banking
 Samsung: entertainment
 Telecom Italia: integrated connectivity and services

Premium partners
 Coop: food distribution

Other partners
 Algida (Unilever): gelato
 Birrificio Angelo Poretti: beer
 Eataly: Italian food
 Gewiss: lighting
 Granarolo: milk products
 Lavazza: coffee
 Martini: drinks
 San Pellegrino: mineral water
 Swatch: official timekeeper

Controversy

Expo 2015's opening on May 1 was met with protests by a black bloc of anti-austerity activists, with police using tear gas. Although Vatican City invested €3 million in its pavilion before Pope Francis' election, he said that it was good for the church to be involved in causes which fight hunger and promote clean energy but too much money was wasted on the Expo by the Vatican.

Italian analysts like Daniela Danna have analysed the massive cost overruns for the project, the inflated prices paid for the land (with conflict of interest, the sellers and buyers sometimes being the same), poor worker contracts, the presence of large multinationals, the pouring of huge amounts of cement on the site, pushing through three new road projects that had previously been blocked (one outer bypass, the TEEM A58 cost €1.7 billion or US$2bn for 30 km, dubbed the most expensive highway in Europe), an abortive scenic canal network that was left incomplete, and the failure to find a buyer for the site after the event. She says protest in Milan and across Italy was inevitable, because "organizing circuses is politically risky when bread is hard to come by".

Food
Several unusual (or unique) food choices were offered during the exposition, some normally not permitted in Italy. At Zimbabwe's pavilion, visitors could try burgers made from crocodile, zebra or python (named "crocoburger", "zebraburger" and "savanaburger" by their creator, consul Georges El Badaoui). The pavilion's food was some of the expo's most innovative and extravagant. At the Japanese pavilion during the expo, European regulations were relaxed and it was possible to taste sashimi from pufferfish (fugu). In the Future Food District were packs of canned insects, common in Southeast Asia but prohibited in the European Union. Italian chef Massimo Bottura and international colleagues created the Refettorio Ambrosiano, a gourmet soup kitchen using waste food from the fair.

Verybello.it
verybello.it was the Italian website for the Expo 2015. The website was launched in January 2015. Its early version has attracted criticism for omitting Sicily from the map of Italy, and for having only the Italian language version present. Website design and name have also been criticized.

The website, as accessed in late March 2015, had an English version, and an expanded map including Sicily.

Sport
World Cup Expo, a football tournament of mixed teams composed of workers from individual pavilions (or clusters), was held during the event.

Mascot
The mascot was Foody was a salad-like character, inspired by the work of Giuseppe Arcimboldo and is composed of eleven different foods, each of which forms a separate mascot, including Chicca the pomegranate. It was designed by Disney Italia.

Pavilions

See also
Jellyfish Barge
Nemo’s Garden (Noli)

References

External links

  
 Official website of the BIE
 European Patent Office
 News on Expo 2015 and on the city of Milan
 EXPO 2015 İzmir Film
 Presentation at the BIE of the Expo 2015 candidature 19 December 2006
 ExpoMuseum's Expo 2015 Page 
 
 BLOG Expo 2015 Milano – News & Expo History
 Rai Expo official multilanguage site, a library of about 1000 videos exploring and explaining "Expo di Milano 2015" theme 
 Photo gallery made by a UNESCO photographer
 Colombia Pavillon Video and Photo gallery
 Website
 A screenshot of the early version of the site, omitting Sicily

2015 in Europe
2015 in Italy
2010s in Milan
World's fairs in Milan
Tourist attractions in Milan